Dietrich Becker (ca. 1623 – Hamburg, 12 May 1679) was a German Baroque violinist and composer.

Little is known about Becker's musical education. His first position was as organist at Ahrensberg. In his second position, in the service of the Chapelle Ducale (Ducal Chapel) of the Duke Christian-Ludwig at Celle, he mainly devoted himself to the violin. In 1662 he settled in Hamburg as a violinist in the service of the Conseil de la Ville (City Council) and in 1667 he was named Maître de Chapelle (Chapel Master).

In 1668 Becker dedicated a collection of pieces entitled  Musikalischen Frühlingsfrüchte (Musical Spring Fruit) to the mayor and members of the City Council. This collection consisted of chamber sonatas and suites for 3 to 5 voices with basso continuo. In 1674, his Zweystimmigen Sonaten und Suiten (Sonatas and Suites for Two Voices) was published.

Becker's chamber music was among the most significant instrumental music coming from Germany during this time.

Sources
Dietrich Becker article in French Wikipedia
Dietrich Becker article in German Wikipedia

External links

 Facsimile in The Royal Library, Copenhagen

German classical composers
German Baroque composers
German classical violinists
Male classical violinists
German violinists
German male violinists
1620s births
1670s deaths
17th-century classical composers
German male classical composers
17th-century male musicians